The Nettle Creek flows into the Grass River in Bucks Bridge, New York.

References 

Rivers of New York (state)